Dnyanada Ramtirthkar (born 26 June 1996) is an Indian television and film actress. She made her television debut with Sakhya Re (2017), and her debut in film with Dhurala (2020). In 2021, she portrayed a role of "Apoorva" in Star Pravah's Thipkyanchi Rangoli.

Early life 
Ramtirthkar was born in Vita, Sangli. However, she currently lives in Pune and Mumbai.
She completed her secondary education in Pune from P.E.S. Modern Girls High School. For higher studies, she attended Marathwada Mitramandal College of Commerce, where she studied Commerce.

Filmography

Television

Feature films

References

External links 

 
 Dnyanada Ramtirthkar on Celebcouch

1996 births
Living people
Actresses from Maharashtra
Indian soap opera actresses
Indian television actresses
21st-century Indian actresses
Actresses in Marathi television